Starter may refer to:

Science and technology 
 Starter motors, for internal-combustion engines
 Motor starter, a motor controller for large electric motors
 Motor soft starter
 Lamp starter, for fluorescent lights
 Glow switch starter, a type of fluorescent starter

Food and meals 
 Bread starter, a fermented mixture for baking
 Fermentation starter
 Starter, entrée and hors d'œuvre, eaten to start a meal

Sports 
 Starting pistol, in athletics competitions
 A player in the starting lineup
 A starting pitcher in baseball
 Operator of the starting barrier to begin a horse race

Other uses 
 Starter (clothing line), a brand
 Booster pack#Starter deck, for a card-based game
 Jan Janszoon Starter (1593–1626), Dutch poet

See also
 
 Restarter (disambiguation)
 Start (disambiguation)